The 1974–75 season was Mansfield Town's 38th season in the Football League and 6th in the Fourth Division, they finished in 1st position with 68 points, gaining a return to the Third Division.

Final league table

Results

Football League Fourth Division

FA Cup

League Cup

Squad statistics
 Squad list sourced from

References
General
 Mansfield Town 1974–75 at soccerbase.com (use drop down list to select relevant season)

Specific

Mansfield Town F.C. seasons
Mansfield Town